Tapu may refer to:

Concepts
 Tapu (Polynesian culture), a concept of sacredness from which the word "taboo" is derived
 Tapu (Ottoman law), a form of land tenure in the Ottoman Empire, subject to the tapu resmi tax

Places
 Tapu (Bora Bora), a private island in French Polynesia
 Tapu, New Zealand, a settlement on the Coromandel Peninsula, New Zealand
 Țapu, a village in Micăsasa Commune, Sibiu County, Romania

People and fictional characters
 Codrin Țapu, a Romanian author and psychologist
 Tapu Javeri, a Pakistani photographer
 The "guardian deities," a group of Pokémon species introduced in Pokémon Sun and Moon (Tapu Koko, Tapu Lele, Tapu Bulu, Tapu Fini)

See also
 Dapu (disambiguation)
 Ko Tapu or James Bond Island, an island in the Phang Nga Bay, Thailand